Lengua (Spanish for 'tongue') may refer to:
 Beef tongue, a dish
 Lengua people, an indigenous group of Paraguay
 Lengua, collective name for the Northern Lengua and Southern Lengua languages of Paraguay
 Évert Lengua, Peruvian footballer